Al-Ma'idah ("The Table"  or "The Table Spread with Food") is the fifth chapter (sūrah)  of the Quran, with 120 verses (āyāt). Regarding the timing and contextual background of the revelation (asbāb al-nuzūl), it is a "Medinan surah", which means it is believed to have been revealed in Medina, instead of Mecca.

The chapter's topics include animals which are forbidden, and Jesus' and Moses' missions. Verse 90 prohibits "The intoxicant" (alcohol). Verse 8 contains the passage: "Do not let the hatred of a people lead you to injustice". Al-Tabligh Verse 67 is relevant to the Farewell Pilgrimage and Ghadir Khumm.

Verses (Q5:32–33) have been quoted to denounce killing, by using an abbreviated form such as, "If anyone kills a person, it would be as if he killed the whole people: and if anyone saved a life, it would be as if he saved the life of the whole people". The same formulation appears in the Mishnah in Sanhedrin. However, a columnist for Mosaic presents evidence suggesting that this coincidence is part of the Quran's critique of Judaism, and early Muslims were aware of this context.

Summary

1 Covenants are to be fulfilled
2 Lawful meats
3 Heathen pilgrims not to be molested
4 Islam completed—last revelation of the Quran , Certain kinds of food, gaming, and lotteries forbidden
5 Muslims permitted to eat the food of Jews and Christians, and to marry their women
6 The law of purifications
7-8 Believers reminded of the covenant of Aqabah, Muslims should bear true testimony and not let the hatred of a people prevent them from being just 
9-11 Muslims should forget old quarrels with brethren
12 God’s favour to Muslims
13-15 Disobedience of Jews and Christians exposed
16-18 Jews and Christians are exhorted to accept Islam
19-20 The divinity of Christ denied
21 Jews and Christians not the children of God
22 Muhammad sent as a warner
23-29 Israel’s rebellion at Kadesh Barnea
30-34 The story of Cain and Abel 35-36 The sin of homicide
37-38 The punishment of theft accompanied by apostasy
39 The faithful exhorted to fight for religion
40-41 The punishment of infidels
42-44 The penalty of theft
45-55 Muhammad to judge the Jews and Christians by the law, gospel, and the Quran
56 Muslims forbidden to fraternise with Jews and Christians
57-58 Hypocrites threatened
59-61 Believers warned and instructed.  The fate of the People of the Book
62-63 Muslims not to associate with infidels
64-65 The Jews exhorted and warned
66-69 The hypocrisy and unbelief of the Jews rebuked
70 Promises to believing Jews and Christians 	
71 Muhammad required to preach
72 He attests Jewish and Christian Scriptures
73 Believing Jews, Sabians, and Christians to be saved 	
74-75 The Jews rejected and killed the prophets of God
76-81 The doctrines of the Trinity and Christ’s Sonship rejected
82-84 Disobedient Jews cursed by their prophets
85-88 Jewish hatred and Christian friendship compared
89-90 Muslims to use lawful food etc
91 Expiation for perjury
92-94 Wine and lots forbidden
95-97 Law concerning hunting and gaming during pilgrimage
98-100 Pilgrimage and its rites  enjoined
101-102 The Prophet not to be pestered with questions
102-104 Heathen Arab customs denounced
105-107 Wills to be attested by witnesses
108 The prophets ignorant of the characters of their followers 	
109-110 Jesus—his miracles—God’s favour to him 	
111 The apostles of Jesus were Muslims 	
112-114 A table provided by Jesus for the apostles 	
115-118 Jesus did not teach his followers to worship him and his mother 	
119 The reward of the true believer 	
120 God is sovereign

Placement and coherence with other surahs
The idea of textual relation between the verses of a chapter has been discussed under various titles such as nazm and munasabah in non-English literature and coherence, text relations, intertextuality, and unity in English literature. Hamiduddin Farahi, an Islamic scholar of the Indian subcontinent, is known for his work on the concept of nazm, or coherence, in the Quran. Fakhruddin al-Razi (died 1209 CE),  Zarkashi (died 1392) and several other classical as well as contemporary Quranic scholars have contributed to the studies. The entire Qur'an thus emerges as a well-connected and systematic book. Each division has a distinct theme. Topics within a division are more or less in the order of revelation. Within each division, each member of the pair complements the other in various ways. The seven divisions are as follows:

Exegesis

3 Verse of Ikmal al-Din

This verse has a Parenthetical Sentence: "This day have those who disbelieve despaired of your religion, so fear them not, and fear Me. This day have I perfected for you your religion and completed My favor on you and chosen for you Islam as a religion.." This verse was revealed at Arafat as reported in the authentic hadith:

27-31 Cain and Abel

The story appears in the Quran 5:27-31:

33 Hirabah verse 
This verse from Qur'anic chapter al-ma'idah (Q5:33) is known as the Hirabah verse (ayat al-hiraba), It specifies punishment for "those who wage war against God and His Messenger and strive to spread disorder in the land": The verbal noun form (i.e. ḥirabah) is frequently used in classical and modern books of Islamic jurisprudence, but neither the word ḥirabah nor the root verb ḥaraba occurs in the Quran. (Yuḥāribūna is the form used in Quran 5:33-4.)

According to early Islamic sources, the verse was revealed after some members of the Urayna tribe feigned conversion to Islam in order to steal Muslims' possessions and killed a young shepherd sent to teach them about the faith. In view of the broad and strong language of the verse, however, various state representatives beginning with the Umayyads have asserted that it applied to rebels in general.

The original meanings of the triliteral root ḥrb are to despoil someones wealth or property, and also fighting or committing sinful act. The Quran "refers to both meanings" in verses 2:279 and 5:33-34.

51 Do not take Jews and Christians as allies
O true believers, take not the Jews, or Christians for your friends; they are friends the one to the other; but whoso among you taketh them for his friends, he is surely one of them: Verily God directeth not unjust people 

Some Muslim hard liners have used verses such as this one to denounce close relationships with non-Muslims and forbidding non-Muslims from becoming leaders in Muslim countries. However, other Muslim scholars such as Shafi Usmani see this as forbidding only "indiscriminating intimacy" which might confuse the "distinctive hallmarks of Islam", while all other equitable relations as being allowed. Ghamidi in the context of his Itmam al-Hujjah interpretation of Islam, restricts the subjects of this verse to only the Jews and Christians of the Muslim Prophet's time. Others argue that only belligerent non-Muslims are being referenced here. 
Verse 51 is preserved in the Ṣan‘ā’1 lower text.

Verse 54
O true believers, whoever of you apostatizeth from his religion, GOD will certainly bring other people to supply his place, whom he will love, and who will love him; who shall be humble towards the believers; but severe to the unbelievers: they shall fight for the religion of GOD, and shall not fear the obloquy of the detractor. This is the bounty of GOD, he bestoweth it on whom he pleaseth: GOD is extensive and wise.

Verse 54 is also interesting in relation to who the "beloved" are; some hadith view it as being Abu Musa al-Ashari. Verse 54 is preserved in the Ṣan‘ā’1 lower text.

Shia' view
On the Shia interpretation of this verse, God used the singular form "waliyyukum" implying the "wilayah" (Guardianship of the believers) is a single project. The word "wali" in the context of this verse cannot mean "friend" because there is not a single verse in the Quran where God says that any one of his messengers is a friend or helper of their followers. Further if the verse implied "wilayah" in the sense of friend or helper, then the singular form "waliyyukum" would not have been used but the plural form "awliya'ukum" would be appropriate because the "friendship" of God is unique.

Tahir ul Qadri writes regarding this verse:

Verses 72 and 73
The Quran: An Encyclopedia says, "The Quran’s objection to Christian practice is Christianity’s shirk, its worship of Jesus, Mary and the saints ‘in derogation of Allah’. There is no justification in believing in the Trinity, for Jesus never would have condoned such a concept". In Sahih International: "(72) They have certainly disbelieved who say, " Allah is the Messiah, the son of Mary" while the Messiah has said, "O Children of Israel, worship Allah, my Lord and your Lord." Indeed, he who associates others with Allah - Allah has forbidden him Paradise, and his refuge is the Fire And there are not for the wrongdoers any helpers. (73) They have certainly disbelieved who say, Allah is the third of three. And there is no god except one God. And if they do not desist from what they are saying, there will surely afflict the disbelievers among them a painful punishment."

Verse 90 
In Verse 90 it says, "O you who have believed, indeed, intoxicants, gambling, [sacrificing on] stone altars [to other than Allah], and divining arrows are but defilement from the work of Satan, so avoid it that you may be successful." This is a clear ruling in The Quran for Muslims to avoid alcohol and gambling.

See also
 Islamic view of the Trinity
 Shirk (Islam)

References

External links 

 Quran 5 at Clear Quran translation 
 Q5:117, 50+ translations, islamawakened.com

Ma'ida
Islam articles needing attention